SAS Mendi (F148) is the last of four s built for the South African Navy by the European South African Corvette Consortium and entered service in March 2007. SAS Mendi was named by Mrs Helena Retief, wife of the (then) Chief of the Navy Vice Admiral Johan Retief.

Construction
Mendi, as with all the Valour-class vessels, was manufactured by the European South African Corvette Consortium (ESACC), consisting of the German Frigate Consortium (Blohm+Voss, Thyssen Rheinstahl and Howaldtswerke Deutsche Werf), African Defence Systems (part of the French Thales defence group) and a number of South African companies.

The ships were built to the MEKO modular design concept, and are designated by the manufacturer as the MEKO A-200SAN class. Some controversy exists as to the class type of the vessel, with both the manufacturer and the South African Navy referring to her as a "corvette", but other similar vessels in other navies being referred to as frigates.

SAS Mendi was built at the Howaldtswerke-Deutsche Werft shipyards in Kiel, Germany, and arrived in South Africa on 20 September 2004.

Namesake
As with all the other ships of the Valour class, Mendi is named after a famous South African battle or instance of great valour.

Notable deployments
A deployment to Brazil and Ghana from Aug to Sep 2007
Operation Boniso 2004
Operational Sea Training Phase training with the German Navy
Exercise Red Lion
On 5 September 2008 Mendi led seven of the South African Navy's newest vessels in a Presidential Fleet Review, the first to be held in South Africa since the 75th anniversary of the Navy in 1997.
Since 2011, SAS Mendi has intermittently been deployed on anti-piracy operations in the Mozambique Channel as part of Operation Copper. All four Valour-class frigates, SAS Drakensberg, and two of the SAN's offshore patrol vessels (OPVs) have intermittently spent time on station since the operation began.

Repair and return to operational status

As of 2021 SAS Mendi was reported to be in reasonable shape and was being brought back to operational status through a staged maintenance and repair program. However, it was also reported that there still remained: "much work ahead. As long dormant systems are used again, small kinks and issues will show and must be ironed out”.

In February 2023, Mendi participated in joint South African-Russian-Chinese exercises which involved the frigate Admiral Gorshkov and tanker Kama from the Russian Navy along with the destroyer Huainan, the frigate Rizhao and the support ship Kekexilihu from the Chinese Navy, as well as other smaller units from the South African Navy.

References

External links

Photos of F148
Valour class entry at South African Navy website

Ships built in Kiel
Valour-class frigates
2003 ships
Frigates of the South African Navy
Military units and formations in Cape Town